Fant–Ewing Coliseum is a 7,085-seat multi-purpose arena in Monroe, Louisiana, United States, on the campus of the University of Louisiana at Monroe. It was built in 1971 and is home to the Louisiana–Monroe Warhawks men's and women's basketball teams and women's volleyball team. The arena also hosts concerts and events.

History

The first men's basketball game played in Fant-Ewing was on December 1, 1971, against Sam Houston State, who defeated ULM 71–70. The Bearkats' Mike Newell made the first free throw of a two-shot foul with no time left on the clock to the disappointment of an opening night capacity crowd. 

It has hosted the Southland Conference men's basketball tournament five times and the Atlantic Sun Conference men's basketball tournament three times.

During the 2006–07 season, a student-only section was created, named the "Hawk's Nest".

See also
 List of NCAA Division I basketball arenas
 List of music venues

References

College basketball venues in the United States
College volleyball venues in the United States
Indoor arenas in Louisiana
Louisiana–Monroe Warhawks men's basketball
Louisiana–Monroe Warhawks women's basketball
Louisiana–Monroe Warhawks women's volleyball
Basketball venues in Louisiana
Volleyball venues in Louisiana
Sports venues in Monroe, Louisiana
Music venues in Louisiana